Esma Sultan ("sublim"; 21 March 1873 – 7 May 1899) was an Ottoman princess, the daughter of Sultan Abdulaziz and Gevheri Kadın.

Early life
Esma Sultan was born on 21 March 1873 in the Dolmabahçe Palace. Her father was Abdulaziz, son of Mahmud II and Pertevniyal Sultan. Her mother was Gevheri Kadın. She was the eldest child of her mother. She was the elder full sister of Şehzade Mehmed Seyfeddin.

Her father, Abdulaziz was deposed by his ministers on 30 May 1876, his nephew Murad V became the Sultan. He was transferred to Feriye Palace the next day. Abdulaziz's entourage didn't wanted to leave the Dolmabahçe Palace, so they were grabbed by the hand and were sent out to the Feriye Palace. In the process, they were searched from head to toe and everything of value was taken from them. On 4 June 1876, Abdulaziz died under mysterious circumstances.

Esma, who was three years old at that time, grew up under the supervision of her elder half-brother, the crown prince Şehzade Yusuf Izzeddin. She had slanting eyebrows, big black eyes, a long face, white skin, and short hair, and was tall. She began her education at the Ihlamur Pavilion, in 1879, along with her brothers, Şehzade Mehmed Seyfeddin and Şehzade Mehmed Şevket, and Sultan Abdul Hamid II's children, Şehzade Mehmed Selim and Zekiye Sultan.

Marriage
In 1889 Sultan Abdul Hamid II arranged her trousseaux and marriage together with her two sisters, princesses Saliha Sultan and Nazime Sultan.

On 20 April 1889 at the age of sixteen, she married Kabasakal Çerkes Mehmed Pasha in the Yıldız Palace. He was the widower of Sultan Abdulmejid I's daughter Naile Sultan and he was twenty years older than her. To marry Esma he divorced by his second wife, a foreign woman, who he was married after Naile's death. She moved in her palace known as "Esma Sultan Mansion", in which Mehmed Pasha and Naile Sultan previously lived.

In 1890, a year after the marriage, she gave birth to her first child, Sultanzade Hasan Bedreddin Bey (died 1909) in 1892 to her second child, Sultanzade Hüseyin Hayreddin Bey (died 1987), in 1894 to her third child, Mihriban Hanımsultan, who died in infancy, and on 14 June 1895 to her fourtg child, Sultanzade Saadeddin Mehmed Bey (died 1976), and in 1899 her fifth and last child, Sultanzade Abdüllah (stillbirth).

Death
Esma Sultan died of childbirth on 7 May 1899 at the age of twenty-six and was buried in the mausoleum of imperial ladies at New Mosque, Eminönü, Istanbul. After her death, Sultan Abdülhamid II decided to get Hatice Sultan, daughter of Sultan Murad V married to her husband, Mehmed Pasha. However, the marriage never took place.

Issue

Ancestry

See also
 Esma Sultan Mansion
 List of Ottoman princesses

References

Sources

 
 

1873 births
1899 deaths
19th-century Ottoman princesses
Deaths in childbirth